Kachumbari is a fresh tomato and onion salad dish that is popular in the cuisines of the African Great Lakes region. It is an uncooked salad dish consisting of chopped tomatoes, onions, and chili peppers. Variations of kachumbari can be found in Kenya, Tanzania, Rwanda, Uganda, Burundi and in the Southern African countries of Malawi and Congo.

The Swahili word kachumbari originated from the Indian word cachumber.

Uses
Kachumbari is used as a salad side dish for a main meal. In Kenya, it is used as a condiment served with pilau (pilaf), mukimo, or a meal of nyama choma (roasted meat) and ugali. In Tanzania, it is eaten with rice pilau or biryani. In Malawi, it is usually eaten on its own like any other salad dish, while in Uganda it is normally eaten with nyama choma.

Variations
Other ingredients, such as lime or lemon juice, fresh cilantro (coriander or dhania), parsley, avocado, or cucumber, and in some cases gin or vodka, can also be added. Some recipe variations also call for habanero or Scotch bonnet peppers, with a touch of ground cayenne pepper.

Kachumbari is popular throughout the African Great Lakes region and can be eaten with African pilaf and African biryani. In Malawi, it is called sumu or shum or simply "tomato and onion salad".

See also

 List of African dishes
 List of onion dishes
 Israeli salad
 Shirazi salad
 Pico de gallo

References

External links
 Entry for Kachumbari from Congocookbook.com

Condiments
Kenyan cuisine
Malawian cuisine
Rwandan cuisine
Ugandan cuisine
Onion-based foods
Salads